The Muslim Social Democratic Party, usually referred to as Hummet ("Endeavor"), was a political party in South Caucasus. In 1920, it merged with "Adalat" ("Justice") communist cell in Baku, forming the first Communist Party of Azerbaijan.

"Old" Hummet (1904 - 1920) 
At the end of 1904, the Baku committee of the Russian Social Democratic Party created the Hummet in order to attract Muslim workers. Prominent Hummet politicians included Mammed Amin Rasulzade (until 1913), Meshadi Azizbekov, Prokopius Dzhaparidze, Sultan Medjid Efendiev, Zeynal Zeynalov and Nariman Narimanov. A series of arrests in 1911 weakened the activities of the party, but after the February Revolution, the Hummet renewed its operations.
From 1918 to 1920 the Hummet was represented in the parliament of the Azerbaijan Democratic Republic. 
On February 20, 1920, it merged with the Adalat Party, the Ahrar Party of Iran and Baku Bolsheviks to establish the Azerbaijan Communist Party.

Some sources report that pro-Bolshevik Muslims from the Hummet party participated  in the March Events, massacres by the Shaumyan-led Bolshevik Baku Soviet and Dashnak militia against Azerbaijanis in Baku, in a bid to suppress the Musavat party and to gain control of Baku. Other sources, on the contrary, report that Hummet party members were very critical of the conduct of the events. This is confirmed by the words of Sultan Majid Efendiyev who wrote:
The Dashnaks, who for handsome pay protected the capitalists, Taghiev, Naghiev, and others, massacred to a man, in the name of the Soviet, the population of entire blocks and sections inhabited by the Muslim poor. The Dashnaks under the command of such millionaires as Lalaiev and others, were now destroying not only the Musavatists but Muslims in general... The course of events led to a situation in which the comrades who stood at the head of the Soviet, Shaumyan, Japaridze, and others, became themselves prisoners of Dashnaks..

References

Гуммет | Баку | Энциклопедия | История

Defunct political parties in Azerbaijan
Factions of the Russian Social Democratic Labour Party
Pre-1920 political parties in Azerbaijan
Political parties established in 1904
Political parties of minorities in Imperial Russia
Political parties of the Russian Revolution
Social democratic parties in Azerbaijan
Islamic socialist political parties